Battle of Torsidillas may refer to:

 Battle of Tordesillas (1520),  uprising by citizens of Castile against the rule of Charles V
 Battle of Tordesillas (1812), between the French and the Allies during the Peninsular War